Virudhunagar Junction railway station (station code: VPT) is a junction railway station serving the town of Virudhunagar in Tamil Nadu, India. The station is a part of the Madurai railway division of the Southern Railway zone.−

Location and layout 
The Virudhunagar Junction is located on the eastern side of the city adjacent to the town's SIDCO industrial estate. The station bears the intersection of four branching railway lines and the next nearest train stations are:
 Kalligudi railway station (North)
 Sattur railway station (South)
 Aruppukkottai railway station (East)
 Sivakasi railway station (West)

Lines 
Broad-gauge (BG) Electrified Double line towards 
BG Single line towards  & 
BG Electrified Single line towards 
BG Electrified Double line towards  &

References

External links 

Madurai railway division
Railway stations in Virudhunagar district
Railway junction stations in Tamil Nadu